Tepa brevis is a species of stink bug in the family Pentatomidae.  It is found in Central America and North America.

References

Further reading

 
 
 

Insects described in 1904
Pentatomini